Cattleya alaorii is a species of orchid endemic to Brazil (Bahia).

The species was named after Mr. Alaor Oliveira, former employee at the University of São Paulo at Piracicaba, who first collected this species in a field excursion in the late 1960s.

Distribution
It was discovered in the 1970s in an isolated mountain chain near Itabuna, Bahia state. It grows in the very wet Bahia coastal forests ecoregion of the Atlantic Forest biome (Mata Atlantica Brasileira).

References

External links 
 

alaorii
Endemic orchids of Brazil
Orchids of Bahia
Flora of the Atlantic Forest